Cougar Canyon is a canyon near Kalamalka Lake Provincial Park, in the district municipality of Coldstream.

It is a long canyon running along the eastern side of Kalamalka Lake. The Canyon is very popular with the local rock climbing community. The area contains over 200 bolted routes, with plenty of room for more.

Part of Cougar Canyon is an ecological preserve maintained by the British Columbia Ministry of Environment.

References
 Climbers Access Society of BC article on Cougar Canyon
 BC Ministry of Environment webpage on Cougar Canyon Ecological Reserve
BCGNIS listing "Cougar Canyon"

Climbing areas of British Columbia
Canyons and gorges of British Columbia